Imnaha National Forest was established in Oregon on March 1, 1907 with  when the first Wallowa National Forest and Chenismus National Forest were combined. Its lands presently exist as part of Wallowa–Whitman National Forest.

It is adjacent to Hells Canyon National Recreation Area.

References

External links
Forest History Society
Listing of the National Forests of the United States and Their Dates (from the Forest History Society website) Text from Davis, Richard C., ed. Encyclopedia of American Forest and Conservation History. New York: Macmillan Publishing Company for the Forest History Society, 1983. Vol. II, pp. 743-788.

Former National Forests of Oregon
1907 establishments in Oregon
Protected areas established in 1907